is a train station in Higashi-ku, Nagoya, Aichi Prefecture, Japan

Lines

 (Station number: S07)

Layout

Platforms

References

External links
 

Railway stations in Japan opened in 1989
Railway stations in Aichi Prefecture